Jorge Manuel Ulate Arguedas (born 14 April 1956) is a retired Costa Rican football striker.

Club career
Nicknamed Gugui, Ulate made his professional debut for hometown club Herediano on 5 June 1977 and also had a significant stay with Alajuelense, becoming the league's top goalscorer twice, in 1984 with 17 goals and in 1985 with 21 goals. He scored a total of 130 league goals.

He also played for Honduran top clubs Olimpia and Victoria and had spells with smaller Costa Rican clubs.

International career
He made his debut for Costa Rica in a May 1979 Olympic Games qualifier against Panama and earned a total of 14 caps, scoring 8 goals. He represented his country in 3 FIFA World Cup qualification matches.

Managerial career
Ulate replaced Luis Roberto Sibaja as manager of second division side Universidad in summer 2003. He managed his son Jorge Pablo in 2010 when in charge of El Roble.

References

External links

1956 births
Living people
People from Heredia (canton)
Association football forwards
Costa Rican footballers
Costa Rica international footballers
C.S. Herediano footballers
Puntarenas F.C. players
L.D. Alajuelense footballers
C.D. Olimpia players
C.D. Victoria players
A.D. Carmelita footballers
Costa Rican expatriate footballers
Expatriate footballers in Honduras
Liga FPD players